Mira Meyan Khatun or Mayan Khatun (born. 1874/1873, Ba'adra, Ottoman Empire - died 1957/1958, Sinjar, Kingdom of Iraq) — Yazidi princess, a regent of Yezidi Emirate of Sheikhan in 1913-1957.

Life
Mayan was a daughter of the well known Yezidi prince Abdi Beg.  She was the wife of Mir Ali Beg, mother of Mir Sa'id Beg and a grandmother of Mir Tahsin Beg.   She is said to have been an extraordinary personality and respected as the legal guardian of her son and later also of her grandson Tahsin Beg.

In an event known as the Year of the General in the year 1892, the Ottoman general Omar Wehbi Pasha waged a military campaign against the Yazidi and she and her husband, Mîr Ali Beg were sent to exile from which they only with difficulties could arrange their return.

Meyan Khatun's grandson, Prince Tahseen Said, held the symbolic position of Prince of the Yezidis until his death in January 2020.

References

19th-century women from the Ottoman Empire
Female heads of state
20th-century women rulers
Iraqi Yazidis
Yazidi princesses
Kurdish people from the Ottoman Empire
Iraqi Kurdish women
1874 births
1957 deaths